eSikhawini is a town in King Cetshwayo District Municipality in the KwaZulu-Natal province of South Africa.

eSikhawini is located 2 km off the N2 route. Richards Bay and Empangeni are closest towns, being both located 15–20 km away. It was established in 1976 as a black township consisting of middle income residents.

Sports facilities 
Esikhawini H Ground
Esikhawini College
Tisand Tech High School

Places
Madlankala Reserve 
Madlankala village
Mabuyeni
Esikhawini J
Esikhawini H
Dube village Found on the northern outskirts of the H section it is one of the oldest villages of Esikhawini.

References

Populated places in the uMhlathuze Local Municipality
Townships in KwaZulu-Natal
Populated places established in 1976